Agarwood, aloeswood, eaglewood or gharuwood is a fragrant dark resinous wood used in incense, perfume, and small carvings. This resinous wood is most commonly referred to as oud or oudh (from). It is formed in the heartwood of aquilaria trees when they become infected with a type of mold (Phialophora parasitica) and secretes a resin to combat the mold. Prior to infection, the heartwood is odourless, relatively light and pale coloured; however, as the infection progresses, the tree produces a dark aromatic resin, called aloes (not to be confused with Aloe ferox, the succulent commonly known as the bitter aloe) or agar (not to be confused with the edible, algae-derived agar) as well as gaharu, jinko, oud, or oodh aguru (not to be confused with bukhoor), in response to the attack, which results in a very dense, dark, resin-embedded heartwood. The resin-embedded wood is valued in East and South Asian cultures for its distinctive fragrance, and thus is used for incense and perfumes.

One of the main reasons for the relative rarity and high cost of agarwood is the depletion of the wild resource. Since 1995, Aquilaria malaccensis, the primary source, has been listed in Appendix II (potentially threatened species) by the Convention on International Trade in Endangered Species of Wild Fauna and Flora. In 2004, all Aquilaria species were listed in Appendix II; however, a number of countries have outstanding reservations regarding that listing.

The aromatic qualities of agarwood are influenced by the species, geographic location, its branch, trunk and root origin, length of time since infection, and methods of harvesting and processing.

First-grade agarwood is one of the most expensive natural raw materials in the world, with 2010 prices for superior pure material as high as US$100,000/kg, although in practice adulteration of the wood and oil is common, allowing for prices as low as US$100/kg. A whole range of qualities and products are on the market, varying in quality with geographical location, botanical species, the age of the specific tree, cultural deposition and the section of the tree where the piece of agarwood stems from.  , the current global market for agarwood is estimated to be in the range of US$6–8 billion and is growing rapidly.

Denomination

Etymology
The word ultimately comes from one of the Dravidian languages, probably from Tamil அகில் (agil).

Vernacular names

Agarwood is known under many names in different cultures:

 Another name is Lignum aloes or Aloeswood, unrelated to the familiar genus, Aloe. Also from aghil, via Hebrew and Greek.
In Assamese it is called as "xasi" (সাঁচি).
In Bengali, agarwood is known as agor gach (আগর গাছ) and the agarwood oil as  agor ator (আগর আতর).
In Odia, it is called as "agara" (ଅଗର).
In Cambodia, it is called "chann crassna". The fragrance from this wood is called "khloem chann" (ខ្លឹមចាន់) or "khloem chann crassna". "khloem" is hard wood, "chann crassna" is the tree species Aquilaria crassna in the Khmer language.
In Hindi, it is known as agar, which is derived originally from the Sanskrit aguru.
 In Sinhala Agarwood producing Gyrinops walla tree is known as "Walla Patta" (වල්ල පට්ට).
 In Tamil it is called "aghil" (அகில்) though what was referred in ancient Tamil literature could well be Excoecaria agallocha.
 In Telugu and Kannada, it is known by the same Sanskrit name as Aguru.
 It is known as Chénxiāng (沉香) in Chinese, Chimhyang (침향) in Korean, Jinkō (沈香) in Japanese, and trầm hương in Vietnamese; all meaning "deep scent" and alluding to its intense scent. In Japan, there are several grades of Jinkō, the highest of which is known as Kyara (伽羅). In Vietnam, ancient texts also refer to the use of agarwood in relation to travelling Buddhist monks.
 In Tibetan it is known as ཨ་ག་རུ་ (a-ga-ru). There are several varieties used in Tibetan Medicine: unique eaglewood: yellow eaglewood: ཨ་ག་རུ་སེར་པོ་ (a-ga-ru ser-po), white eaglewood: ཨར་སྐྱ་ (ar-skya), and black eaglewood: ཨར་ནག་(ar-nag).
 Both agarwood and its resin distillate/extracts are known as oud (عود) in Arabic (literally "rod/stick") and used to describe agarwood in Arab countries. Western perfumers also often use agarwood essential oil under the name "oud" or "oudh".
 In Europe it was referred to as Lignum aquila (eagle-wood) or Agilawood, from similarity to Tamil-Malayalam aghil.
 In Indonesian and Malay, it is called "gaharu".
 In The Philippines, it is known as Lapnisan.
 In Papua New Guinea it is called "ghara" or eagle wood.
 In Thai it is known as mai kritsana (ไม้กฤษณา).
 In Laos it is known as mai ketsana (ໄມ້ເກດສະໜາ).
 In Myanmar (Burmese), it is known as Thit Mhwae (သစ်မွှေး).

History
The odour of agarwood is complex and pleasing, with few or no similar natural analogues. In the perfume state, the scent is mainly distinguished by a combination of "oriental-woody" and "very soft fruity-floral" notes. The incense smoke is also characterized by a "sweet-balsamic" note and "shades of vanilla and musk" and amber (not to be confused with ambergris). As a result, agarwood and its essential oil gained great cultural and religious significance in ancient civilizations around the world, being described as a fragrant product as early as 1400 BCE in the Vedas of India.

In the Hebrew Bible, "trees of lign aloes" are mentioned in The Book of Numbers 24:6 and a perfume compounded of aloeswood, myrrh, and cassia is described in Psalms 45.

Dioscorides in his book Materia Medica (65 CE) described several medical qualities of agarwood (Áγαλλοχου) and mentioned its use as an incense. Even though Dioscorides describes agarwood as having an astringent and bitter taste, it was used to freshen the breath when chewed or as a decoction held in the mouth. He also writes that a root extract was used to treat stomach complaints and dysentery as well as pains of the lungs and liver. Agarwood's use as a medicinal product was also recorded in the Sahih Muslim, which dates back to approximately the eighth century, and in the Ayurvedic medicinal text the Susruta Samhita.

As early as the third century CE in ancient Viet Nam, the chronicle Nan zhou yi wu zhi (Strange things from the South) written by Wa Zhen of the Eastern Wu Dynasty mentioned agarwood produced in the Rinan commandery, now Central Vietnam, and how people collected it in the mountains.

During the sixth century CE in Japan, in the recordings of the Nihon Shoki (The Chronicles of Japan) the second oldest book of classical Japanese history, mention is made of a large piece of fragrant wood identified as agarwood. The source for this piece of wood is claimed to be from Pursat, Cambodia (based on the smell of the wood). The famous piece of wood still remains in Japan today and is showcased less than 10 times per century at the Nara National Museum.

Agarwood is highly revered in Hinduism, Chinese Folk Religion and Islam.

Starting in 1580 after Nguyễn Hoàng took control over the central provinces of modern Vietnam, he encouraged trade with other countries, specifically China and Japan. Agarwood was exported in three varieties: Calambac (kỳ nam in Vietnamese), trầm hương (very similar but slightly harder and slightly more abundant), and agarwood proper. A pound of Calambac bought in Hội An for 15 taels could be sold in Nagasaki for 600 taels. The Nguyễn Lords soon established a Royal Monopoly over the sale of Calambac. This monopoly helped fund the Nguyễn state finances during the early years of the Nguyen rule.
Accounts of international trade in agarwood date back as early as the thirteenth century, note India being one of the earliest sources of agarwood for foreign markets.

Xuanzang's travelogues and the Harshacharita, written in seventh century AD in Northern India, mentions use of agarwood products such as 'Xasipat' (writing-material) and 'aloe-oil' in ancient Assam (Kamarupa). The tradition of making writing materials from its bark still exists in Assam.

It is to this day still used in traditional Chinese herbal medicince where it goes by the name of Chén Xiāng - 沉香 - Literally meaning 'sinking fragrance'. Its earliest recorded mention is from the Miscellaneous Records of Famous Physicians, 名医别录 , Ming Yi Bie Lu,  ascribed to the author Táo Hǒng-Jǐng c.420-589.

Formation

Production mode
There are seventeen species in the genus Aquilaria, large evergreens native to southeast Asia, and nine are known to produce agar wood. In theory agarwood can be produced from all members; however, until recently it was primarily produced from  A. malaccensis. A. agallocha and A. secundaria are synonyms for A. malaccensis. A. crassna and A. sinensis are the other two members of the genus that are usually harvested. The gyrinops tree can also produce agarwood.

Formation of agar wood occurs in the trunk and roots of trees that have been penetrated by an insect feeding on wood and oily resin, the Ambrosia beetle (Dinoplatypus chevrolati). A mold infection may then occur, and in response, the tree produces a salutary self-defense material to conceal damages or infections. While the unaffected wood of the tree is relatively light in color, the resin dramatically increases the mass and density of the affected wood, changing its color from a pale beige to yellow, orange, red, dark brown or black. In natural forests, only about 7 out of 100 Aquilaria trees of the same species are infected and produce aloes/agar wood. A common method in artificial forestry is to inoculate trees with the fungus. It produces a "damage sap" and is referred to as "fake" aloes/agar wood.

Oud oil can be distilled from agar wood using steam; the total yield of oil for 70 kg of wood will not exceed 20 ml.

Composition
The composition of agarwood oil is exceedingly complex with more than 150 chemical compounds identified. At least 70 of these are terpenoids which come in the form of sesquiterpenes and chromones; no monoterpenes have been detected at all. Other common classes of compounds include agarofurans, cadinanes, eudesmanes, valencanes and eremophilanes, guaianes, prezizanes, vetispiranes, simple volatile aromatic compounds as well as a range of miscellaneous compounds. The exact balance of these materials will vary depending on the age and species of tree as well as the exact details of the oil extraction process.

Perfumery

Oud has become a popular component in perfumery. Most brands have a creation based on or dedicated to "oud" or an accord of oud created through the use of certain chemical scent components. Few perfume houses use real oud in their creations. This is because oud is very expensive and potent. Oud is generally used as a base note and is traditionally pared with rose. Oud essential oil is available on the internet but care should be taken in chosing the vendor. Due to the fact that oud is such an expensive material there is a big market for diluting oud oil with patchouli or other chemical components.

Aquilaria species that produce agarwood
The following species of Aquilaria produce agarwood:
 Aquilaria acuminata, found in Papua New Guinea, Indonesia & Philippines
 Aquilaria apiculata, found in Philippines
 Aquilaria baillonil, found in Thailand and Cambodia
 Aquilaria banaensae, found in Vietnam
 Aquilaria beccariana, found in Indonesia
 Aquilaria brachyantha, found in Malaysia
 Aquilaria crassna found in Cambodia, Malaysia, Thailand, Laos and Vietnam
 Aquilaria cumingiana, found in Indonesia and Malaysia
 Aquilaria filaria, found in New Guinea, the Moluccas, and Mindanao (Philippines)
 Aquilaria grandiflora, found in China
 Aquilaria hirta, found in Thailand, Indonesia and Malaysia
 Aquilaria khasiana, found in Bangladesh and India.
 Aquilaria malaccensis, found in Indonesia, Malaysia, Laos, Thailand, and India
 Aquilaria microcarpa, found in Indonesia and Malaysia
 Aquilaria rostrata, found in Malaysia
 Aquilaria sinensis, found in China and Laos
 Aquilaria subintegra, found in Thailand

* Sri Lankan agarwood is known as Walla Patta and is of the Gyrinops walla species.

Conservation of agarwood-producing species
Overharvesting and habitat loss threatens some populations of agarwood-producing species.  Concern over the impact of the global demand for agarwood has thus led to the inclusion of the main taxa on CITES Appendix II, which requires that international trade in agarwood be monitored. Monitoring is conducted by Cambridge-based TRAFFIC (a joint WWF and IUCN programme). CITES also provides that international trade in agarwood be subject to controls designed to ensure that harvest and exports are not to the detriment of the survival of the species in the wild.

In addition, agarwood plantations have been established in a number of countries, and reintroduced into countries such as Malaysia and Sri Lanka as commercial plantation crops. The success of these plantations depends on the stimulation of agarwood production in the trees.  Numerous inoculation techniques have been developed, with varying degrees of success.

See also 
 Incense in India
 Sandalwood

References

Further reading

External links
 
 Hong Kong herbarium factsheet of Aquilaria sinensis (archived 13 August 2005)
 Etymology of agarwood and aloe
 "Sustainable Agarwood Production in Aquilaria Trees" at the University of Minnesota
 Traditional and Medicinal Uses of Aquilaria / Agarwood The Cropwatch Files
 expensive material, BusinessInsider; video.

Incense material
Resins
Wood
Medicinal plants of Asia
Perfume ingredients

sv:Örnträd